The 2009–10 Canadian network television schedule indicates the fall prime time schedules for Canada's major English and French broadcast networks. For schedule changes after the fall launch, please consult each network's individual article.

Note: TQS rebrands as the V Network

2010 official winter schedule

Sunday

Monday

Tuesday

Wednesday

Thursday

Friday

Saturday

Top weekly ratings
 Note: English Canadian television only by viewers age 2 and up
 Data sources: BBM Canada official website

References

External links
BBM Canada Top Weekly Television Ratings

2009 in Canadian television
2010 in Canadian television
Canadian television schedules